The 2019–20 Liga EBA season was the 26th season of the Spanish basketball fourth league. It started on 21 September 2019 with the first round of the regular season and was curtailed on 8 May 2020 due to the COVID-19 pandemic.

Season summary
On March 10, 2020, the Government of Spain decreed that all games would be played behind closed doors due to the COVID-19 pandemic. On March 12, 2020, the Spanish Basketball Federation postponed all the games of the next two weeks. On March 18, 2020, the Spanish Basketball Federation extended the postponement of the games until March 29 due to the state of alarm. On March 25, 2020, the Spanish Basketball Federation extended the postponement of the games until April 12 due to the extension of state of alarm.

On May 8, 2020, the Spanish Basketball Federation finished prematurely the regular season due to force majeure with the following decisions:
Relegations to Primera División were revoked.
Six promotions to LEB Plata were agreed as follows:
The top team in each of the five conferences as of March 8 promoted directly to LEB Plata.
The 6th promotion were determined under a ranking among the next best qualified team of the five conferences as of March 8, using as criteria the number of years of participation in FEB competitions during the last five seasons. In case of a tie, the number of participations in higher competitions during the last five seasons would be valued differently.

On June 22, 2020, the Spanish Basketball Federation announced the six teams that promoted to LEB Plata.

Before this announcemente, Universitat de Vic CB Vic, best team of the Group C, resigned to promotion.

Conference A
The Conference A consisted of 2 groups of 15 and 14 teams from Galicia, Asturias, Cantabria, Castile and León, Navarre, La Rioja and Basque Country.

Teams

Regular season

Group A–A

Group A–B

Conference B
The Conference B consisted of 16 teams from Canary Islands, Castilla–La Mancha and Community of Madrid.

Teams

Regular season

League table

Conference C
The Conference C consisted of 2 groups of 14 teams from Aragon, Catalonia and Balearic Islands.

Teams

Regular season

Group C–A

Group C–B

Conference D
The Conference D consisted of 2 groups of 10 and 9 teams from Andalusia, Extremadura, Ceuta and Melilla.

Teams

Regular season

Group D–A

Group D–B

Second stage

Promotion group

Relegation group

Conference E
The Conference E consisted of 2 groups of eight and nine teams from Valencian Community and Murcia.

Teams

Regular season

Group E–A

Group E–B

Second stage

Promotion group

Relegation group

References

External links
Liga EBA at FEB.es 

Liga EBA seasons
EBA
Liga EBA